Mark O'Brien (born 13 May 1984 in Dublin, Ireland), is an Irish footballer who plays for Dundalk in the League of Ireland Premier Division.

O'Brien is a central midfielder and comes from a footballing background as his father Derek played for Shamrock Rovers from 1981 to 1983 and his uncles Fran and Ray both played for Ireland. His younger brother Colin played alongside him at Shelbourne.

Career

Early years
O'Brien played for Belvedere at youth level and made several appearances at under-age level for Ireland. He began his senior career at Shamrock Rovers making his debut on 7 May 2003 in a League of Ireland Cup tie against Bray Wanderers. He impressed enough to win the Young Player of the Year at the club in 2004.

Bohemians
O'Brien then signed for bitter rivals Bohemians for the 2005 season and he made his debut for Bohs against his former club Shamrock Rovers on 18 March 2005 at Dalymount Park. He never showed the same form at Bohemians and midway through the 2006 season, he returned to Shamrock Rovers on loan where he helped the Hoops to the First Division title. After his loan spell finished at the end of the 2006 season, he returned to Bohemians but had failed to appear for the first team during the 2007 season only making under-21 appearances.

Shelbourne
In need to restart his flagging career, O'Brien departed Bohemians to sign on loan for nearby rivals Shelbourne in July 2007. Mark made his Shelbourne debut on 6 July 2007 against Wexford Youths at Tolka Park in a 1–0 win for Shels and he scored his first Shels goal during a 4–1 victory over Athlone Town at Lissywoollen on 12 October 2007.

O'Brien permanently joined Shelbourne on 29 November 2007. He finished as a First Division runner-up with Shelbourne in both 2008 and 2009 as Shelbourne narrowly missed out on promotion during both seasons. O'Brien was released by Shelbourne following the conclusion of the 2009 season. In his 3 seasons at Shelbourne he made 85 league and cup appearances scoring 5 goals.

Bray Wanderers
In March 2010 O'Brien returned to football signing for Bray Wanderers. He scored twice on his Bray debut in the EA Sports Cup against Drogheda United but failed to hold down a first team place after this. O'Brien parted company with Bray Wanderers in July 2010 after making 5 appearances for the club. On 27 August 2010, O'Brien returned to Shelbourne after training with the club for a number of weeks.

Drogheda United
Prior to the start of the 2011 League of Ireland season, O'Brien joined Drogheda United. His first goal for the Drogs was the winner in a 2–1 win over Galway United on 26 May 2011, their first win of the season. After nailing down a starting place in Mick Cooke's midfield, O'Brien signed a new one-year contract for the Drogs, keeping him at United Park until the end of the 2012 season.

Dundalk
He joined Dundalk on the final day of the 2012 July transfer window. His father had played for the Lilywhites in the 1970s.

Honours
 League of Ireland First Division
 Shamrock Rovers – 2006
SRFC Young Player of the Year:
 Shamrock Rovers – 2004

References

External links
Mark O'Brien's profile at www.shelbournefc.com

1984 births
Living people
Association footballers from County Dublin
Republic of Ireland association footballers
Association football midfielders
League of Ireland players
Shamrock Rovers F.C. players
Bohemian F.C. players
Shelbourne F.C. players
Bray Wanderers F.C. players
Drogheda United F.C. players
Dundalk F.C. players
Belvedere F.C. players
Republic of Ireland youth international footballers